Sir John Anstruther, 2nd Baronet (27 December 1718 – 4 July 1799) was a Scottish industrialist and politician.

He was the only surviving son of Sir John Anstruther, 1st Baronet, M.P., by Lady Margaret Carmichael, the daughter of James, 2nd Earl of Hyndford and was educated at the University of Glasgow (1733). He succeeded his father as a baronet in the Baronetage of Nova Scotia on 27 September 1753.

In 1771, with his business partner, Robert Fall, he established the Newark Coal and Salt Company. Coal was extracted from land to the east of St Monans in Fife, and some used to heat salt pans which operated, in conjunction with the still-standing St Monan's Windmill, on the shore to the east of the village. Production at the salt pans employed 20 men and the colliery 36 men. Both saltpans and coal mine were linked by a waggonway to Pittenweem harbour, which was expanded and developed at Sir John's expense.

He served as Member of Parliament for Anstruther Burghs from 1766 to 1774, 1780–1783 and 1790–1793.

He married Janet Fall, Queen of the Gypsies and the second daughter of James Fall, on 4 October 1750. Lady Anstruther was painted by Sir Joshua Reynolds in 1761. They had 3 surviving sons and a daughter. He was succeeded by his eldest son, Philip Anstruther-Paterson.

Like his father, he had a personal library of some significance and books from his collection can be identified by the presence of his engraved bookplate.

References

Burke's Peerage 107th ed.

Anstruther, Sir John
Anstruther, Sir John
Alumni of the University of Glasgow
Baronets in the Baronetage of Nova Scotia
Anstruther, Sir John Anstruther, 2nd Bt
British MPs 1761–1768
British MPs 1780–1784
British MPs 1790–1796
John, 2nd Baronet